TTP may refer to:

Arts, entertainment, and media
 Tractatus Theologico-Politicus, a book by the philosopher Baruch Spinoza

Biology
 Thrombotic thrombocytopenic purpura, a blood disorder
 Tristetraprolin, a protein

Computing 
 Terrorist Tactics, Techniques, and Procedures used by terrorists, studied by cyber security specialists
 .TTP ("TOS Takes Parameters"), a filename extension for Atari TOS
 Time-Triggered Protocol in networking

Military
 Military doctrine, consisting of Tactics, Techniques, and Procedures

Enterprises and organizations
 Tehreek-e-Tahaffuz-e-Pakistan, a political party
 Tehrik-i-Taliban Pakistan ("Taliban Movement of Pakistan")

Shopping Centres
 Westfield Tea Tree Plaza

Other uses
 Trusted third party in cryptography